Barry Robert Pittendrigh is a Canadian American molecular biologist, researcher and educator. He holds the John V. Osmun Endowed Chair and is the Director of the Center for Urban and Industrial Pest Management at Purdue University.

Pittendrigh's research has been focused on the molecular mechanisms of insecticide resistance, the structural and functional genomics of head and body lice, the genomics of termites, and the development of pest controls strategies for cowpea pests within a West African context. He has written over 175 scientific papers and book chapters.

Pittendrigh is the co-founder of Scientific Animations Without Borders (SAWBO), which is a research program and extension approach for conveying scientific and extension information through two-and three-dimensional animations.

Early life and education 
Pittendrigh was born and raised in Regina, Saskatchewan, where he went to Thom Collegiate.  He is the brother of the Canadian financial economist, Scott Pittendrigh.  He received his B.Sc. Honours in Biology from University of Regina in 1990 and was awarded the University Prize in Science upon graduation. During his undergraduate career he worked as a summer student at the Plant Biotechnology Institute at National Research Council in Saskatoon, Canada. Later he moved to the United States, where he received his M.S. in Entomology from Purdue University in 1994 and a Ph.D. in Entomology from University of Wisconsin-Madison in 1999. During his PhD program he spent time, as a visiting student, at both the University of Chicago in the Department of Ecology and Evolution and at CSIRO at Black Mountain in Canberra, Australia. He completed his post-doctoral training at the Max Planck Institute for Chemical Ecology in Jena, Germany, in 2000.

Career 
In 2000, Pittendrigh joined Purdue University as an assistant professor in the Department Entomology, becoming associate professor in 2004. In 2008, he left Purdue University and joined University of Illinois at Urbana-Champaign, where he was both a professor and held the C.W. Kearns, C.L. Metcalf and W.P. Flint Endowed Chair in Insect Toxicology.

Pittendrigh left the University of Illinois at Urbana-Champaign in 2016 to join Michigan State University, where he holds an MSU Foundation Professor position. In 2018, Michigan State University appointed him as the associate departmental chairperson of the Department of Entomology and the director of Feed the Future Legume Systems Research Innovations Lab.

In January of 2021, he returned to Purdue University where he holds John V. Osmun Endowed Chair and is the Director of the Center for Urban and Industrial Pest Management.

In 2011, Pittendrigh was invited to speak at TEDxUIUC, where he spoke about a program he co-founded, Scientific Animations Without Borders. In 2017, he was invited to be a representative to the International Year of Pulses event at the United Nations.

He has served on the editorial boards of Pesticide Biochemistry and Physiology and the International Journal of Tropical Insect Sciences.

Research and work

Molecular basis of pesticide resistance 
Pittendrigh has used Drosophila melanogaster as a model system to understand how organisms respond to dietary factors or drugs, or evolve resistance to xenobiotics such as pesticides. Most notably his research has used genomic, transcriptomic, and proteomic approaches to understand the evolution of resistance to pesticides. His later work in this area has been focused on the role of microRNAs in the evolution of pesticide resistance.

Body Louse Genome Project 
Pittendrigh was the lead author on the White Paper that was funded by NIH for the sequencing of the body louse genome. Subsequently, he served as the director and community coordinator of the Body Louse Genome Sequencing Consortium, a group of over 60 scientists that worked to develop an understanding of the annotation and interpretation of the body louse genome sequence and the genome of the obligate endosymbiont that lives in the body louse. The project was active from 2005 to 2010. The resultant paper was published in PNAS. Pittendrigh has actively published on work facilitated by the availability of this genome, including research on determining that parasites evolve faster than their hosts, understanding vector competence in body lice (as compared to head lice that do not vector diseases), and demonstrating that body lice develop from head lice during low hygiene conditions.

Integrated pest management of cowpea cropping systems 
A large part of Pittendrigh's work has also been focused on international development, specifically in West Africa. He, his laboratory team, and his collaborators, spread across five countries in West Africa, including Nigeria, Niger, Burkina Faso, Mali, and Ghana, developed environmentally benign pest control solutions to minimize the populations of pest insects that attack cowpea, an important protein source for the local populace.

Scientific Animations Without Borders 
In 2011, Pittendrigh and collaborator Dr. Julia Bello-Bravo, launched Scientific Animations Without Borders (SAWBO), a program focused on taking scientifically validated expert knowledge and placing it into a format understandable by people of all literacy levels, where the content can be placed into numerous languages. The resultant educational content is made freely available for other international development organizations to integrate into their educational programs as they see fit. SAWBO has been featured on PBS, The Big Ten Network and in Reuters as well as in other local US-based news outlets. SAWBO also represents a research platform to study the last mile problem of how to deliver educational content to people in remote areas in developing nation countries. SAWBO has worked with major development organizations such as the United States Agency for International Development and the World Health Organization regarding scientific messaging. A study conducted by Pittendrigh and his colleagues in rural Mozambique revealed that intervention by animation could result in upwards of an 89% adoption rate of the technique being demonstrated in the animation in the local language. Based on long-term large datasets of global content use, they were able to demonstrate, that 2016 marked the tipping point of when cell phones overtook computers as the primary mechanism by which people accessed educational videos as learning tools.

In 2020, SAWBO was awarded a grant by Feed the Future Initiative to launch the Feed the Future SAWBO Responsive-Adaptive-Participatory Information Dissemination Scaling Program which will disseminate information related to COVID-19's economic impact to the general public.

Awards and honors 
2007 – 2nd Annual Millionaire's Club Award (for a grant funded in excess of one million dollars)
2007 – Acorn Award (“Seed of Excellence Award”), 2007 (for a grant funded in excess of one million dollars)
2007 – C.W. Kearns, C.L. Metcalf, and W.P. Flint Endowed Chair in Insect Toxicology
2008 - An insect species, Myrsidea pittendrighi was named in "honor of Barry Pittendrigh in recognition of his efforts to organize and obtain the first complete sequences of a louse genome, which will be a great asset to work on the systematics of lice."
2012 – Iowa State University – Paul A. Dahm Memorial Lecture
2012 – Sheth Distinguished Faculty Award for International Achievement, University of Illinois
2012 – Champaign-Urbana International Humanitarian Award for the Scientific Animations Without Borders, Research/Education Award
2013 – Campus Award for Excellence in Public Engagement for the Scientific Animations Without Borders program
2014 – University of Regina Alumni Crowing Achievement Award
2015 – Innovation Celebration: Social Venture Award for Scientific Animations Without Borders
2016 – John V. Osmun Award Alumni Professional Achievement Award, Purdue University, West Lafayette, Indiana

Selected publications 
Pedra, J.H.F., L.M. McIntyre, M.E. Scharf, and B.R. Pittendrigh. 2004. Genome-wide transcription profile of field- and laboratory-selected DDT-resistant Drosophila. Proceedings of the National Academy of Sciences. 101(18): 7034-7039.
Pedra, J.H.F., R. A. Festucci-Buselli, W. Sun, W. M. Muir, M. E. Scharf, and B.R. Pittendrigh. 2005. Profiling of abundant proteins associated with dichlorodiphenyltrichloroethane (DDT)-resistance in Drosophila melanogaster. Proteomics. 5(1): 258-269. 
Ewen F. Kirkness, Brian J. Haas, Weilin Sun, ... B.R. Pittendrigh. 2010. Genome sequences of the human body louse and its primary endosymbiont provide insights into the permanent parasitic lifestyle. Proceedings of the National Academy of Sciences. 107(27): 12168-12173.
McDonnell, C.M., D. King, J. M. Comeron, H. Li, W. Sun, M. R. Berenbaum, M. A. Schuler, and B.R. Pittendrigh. 2012. Evolutionary toxicogenomics: diversification of the Cyp12d1 and Cyp12d3 genes in Drosophila species. Journal of Molecular Evolution. 74(5–6): 281-296.
Li-Byarlay, H., J. Massey, B. R. Pittendrigh, and G. E. Robinson. 2014. Drosophila aggression is associated with silencing nicotinamide adenine dinucleotide dehydrogenases in neuron but not glia. Proceedings of the National Academy of Sciences. 111 (34): 12533-12537.
Johnson, K. P., J. M. Allen, B. P. Olds, L. Mugisha, D. L. Reed, K. N. Paige, and B.R. Pittendrigh. 2014. Relative rates of genomic divergence between humans, chimpanzees, and their lice. Proceedings of the Royal Society of London B. 281(1777): 1471-2954.
Seong, K.M., W. Sun, J.M. Clark & B.R. Pittendrigh. 2016. Splice form variant and amino acid changes in MDR49 confers DDT resistance in transgenic Drosophila. Scientific Reports. 6: 23355.
Seong, K.M., Coates, B.S., Sun, W., Clark, J.M., and Pittendrigh, B.R. 2017. Changes in Neuronal Signaling and Cell Stress Response Pathways are Associated with a Multigenic Response of Drosophila melanogaster to DDT Selection. Genome Biology and Evolution. 9(12):3356-3372.
Seong, K.M., B. Coates, D. Kim, A. Hansen, and B. Pittendrigh. 2018. Differentially expressed microRNAs associated with changes of transcript levels in detoxification pathways and DDT-resistance in the Drosophila melanogaster strain 91-R. PLoS ONE. 13(4), e0196518.
Seong, K.M., Coates, B.S., and B.R. Pittendrigh. 2019. Impacts of sub-lethal DDT exposures on microRNA and putative target transcript expression in DDT resistant and susceptible Drosophila melanogaster strains. Frontiers in Genetics. 10: 45.

References 

Living people
American people of Canadian descent
Michigan State University faculty
People from Regina, Saskatchewan
University of Regina alumni
Purdue University alumni
University of Wisconsin–Madison alumni
 Year of birth missing (living people)